Dysgonomonas capnocytophagoides  is a Gram-negative and anaerobic bacterium from the genus of Dysgonomonas which has been first isolated from a cutaneous abscess from a human in Denmark. Dysgonomonas capnocytophagoides can cause diarrhoea and bacteraemia.

References

External links
Type strain of Dysgonomonas capnocytophagoides at BacDive -  the Bacterial Diversity Metadatabase

Bacteroidia
Bacteria described in 2000